George Cartwright (born December 10, 1950, in Midnight, Mississippi) is an American musician, best known as the founder of the band Curlew in 1979 in New York City. Besides playing soprano, alto, and tenor saxophones, he has composed music for Curlew, his own solo recordings and other music ensembles such as Zeitgeist. He attended the Creative Music Studio in Woodstock, New York, and currently resides in Minnesota.

Discography 
With Curlew
Curlew (Landslide, 1984)
Live in Berlin (Cuneiform, 1986)
North America (Moers, 1986)
Bee (Cuneiform, 1991)
A Beautiful Western Saddle (Lyrics by Paul Haines) (Cuneiform, 1993)
Paradise (Cuneiform, 1996)
Fabulous Drop (Cuneiform, 1998)
North America (Cuneiform, 2002) 
Gussie [live] (Roaratorio, 2003)
Mercury (Cuneiform, 2003) 
The Hardwood'’(Cuneiform, 1992)

SoloDOT (Cuneiform/Rune, 1994)The Memphis Years (Lyrics by Paul Haines, Vocals by Amy Denio) (Cuneiform/Rune, 2000)Black Ants Crawling (Innova Recordings, 2002)Send Help (Innova Recordings, 2008)

with Michael LytleRed Rope:3 Pieces for 2 Players (Cadence, 1997)

with The Snaildartha 6Snaildartha: The Story of Jerry the Christmas Snail'' (Innova Recordings, 2004)

References 

1950 births
Living people
American jazz musicians
American jazz saxophonists
American male saxophonists
American jazz composers
American male jazz composers
Curlew (band) members
People from Humphreys County, Mississippi
21st-century American saxophonists
Jazz musicians from Mississippi
21st-century American male musicians